The following is a list of characters introduced to the BBC soap opera EastEnders in 2019, by order of first appearance. The characters are introduced by the show's executive consultant, John Yorke, or his successors, senior executive producer, Kate Oates, and executive producer, Jon Sen. The first character to be introduced is Bailey Baker (Kara-Leah Fernandes), the daughter of Mitch Baker (Roger Griffiths). She is followed by her mother Dinah Wilson (Anjela Lauren Smith) who is introduced the following month. Sisters Iqra Ahmed (Priya Davdra) and Habiba Ahmed (Rukku Nahar), the granddaughters of Arshad Ahmed (Madhav Sharma) and Mariam Ahmed (Indira Joshi) are also introduced in February. Danny Hardcastle (Paul Usher) and Midge (Tom Colley), associates of Phil Mitchell (Steve McFadden), are introduced next, followed by Chantelle Atkins (Jessica Plummer), the daughter of Karen Taylor (Lorraine Stanley) and Mitch Baker (Roger Griffiths). Chantelle is joined by her husband Gray Atkins (Toby-Alexander Smith) and her children Mia Atkins (Mahalia Malcolm) and Mackenzie Atkins (Isaac Lemonius). Later, Brooke (Ria Lopez) is introduced as a love interest for Bernadette Taylor (Clair Norris). In June, Daniel Cook (Ade Edmondson) joined, later followed by Jonno Highway (Richard Graham), the father of Stuart (Ricky Champ) and Callum "Halfway" Highway (Tony Clay). In August, the wife of Patrick Trueman (Rudolph Walker), Sheree Trueman (Suzette Llewellyn) was introduced as well as Ash Panesar (Gurlaine Kaur Garcha), the girlfriend of Iqra. In September, Tom Wells joined the cast as Leo King, the son of Tony King (Chris Coghill) and Wanda Baptiste (Anni Domingo) as Sheree's mother. October saw the introductions of the Panesar brothers: Jags (Amar Adatia), Kheerat (Jaz Deol) and Vinny (Shiv Jalota). Additionally, multiple other characters appear throughout the year.

Bailey Baker 

Bailey Baker, played by Kara-Leah Fernandes, first appears in episode 5847, which was first broadcast on 10 January 2019.

Bailey is a girl who is in Mitch Baker's (Roger Griffiths) van when drug addict Craig (Andrew Armitage) tries to break in. She hits him over the head and then Mitch arrives, telling Bailey to keep quiet but she says she is bored so he says he will get her a football to play with. Mick Carter (Danny Dyer) sees Bailey sitting with the ball on the street and when she says it is boring on her own, he says he used to spend hours kicking a ball against a wall. Bailey decides to kick the ball against the wall of Mick's pub, The Queen Victoria, but she smashes an upstairs window. Mick, his wife, Linda Carter (Kellie Bright), Mitch, his son Keegan Baker (Zack Morris) and Keegan's mother, Karen Taylor (Lorraine Stanley) all arrive but when Karen tells Bailey to leave, Mitch is forced to say she is with him. Mitch tells Karen that Bailey is his friend's daughter, and takes Bailey to a football training session. However, after Karen looks after Bailey, Bailey asks Mitch why she is not allowed to tell people that he is her father.

When Bailey returns home from a football game, she is shown to be a young carer for her mother, Dinah Wilson (Anjela Lauren Smith), who is suffering from multiple sclerosis. When the Taylor family find out, they pledge to help out, and encourage Bailey to seek help from a care organisation. When Dinah commits suicide, Bailey moves in with Karen and her children. Bailey overhears a conversation between Karen and Mitch, where she discovers that Karen knew Dinah was going to kill herself. She holds a grudge against Karen for a number of weeks, until Karen buys her a star in honour of her mother. When the COVID-19 lockdown occurs, she goes to live with an aunt. When Chantelle dies, Mitch goes to tell her.

Bailey was called a "mystery newcomer" by Sophie Dainty from Digital Spy.

Dinah Wilson 

Dinah Wilson, played by Anjela Lauren Smith, makes her first appearance in episode 5869, broadcast on 14 February 2019. Dinah is the ex-girlfriend of Mitch Baker (Roger Griffiths) and mother to his daughter Bailey Baker (Kara-Leah Fernandes). It is soon discovered that Dinah suffers from multiple sclerosis and is looked after by Bailey.

Mitch reveals to his ex-girlfriend Karen Taylor (Lorraine Stanley) that Dinah suffers from multiple sclerosis and that Bailey is her carer. Karen, Mitch and their two children Keegan Baker (Zack Morris) and Chantelle Atkins (Jessica Plummer) help Bailey to clean her flat and Dinah becomes friends with Karen. Unbeknownst to Bailey, Dinah's condition is getting worse and she tells Keegan. Dinah's health decline becomes apparent when she has an accident and is rushed to hospital. The Taylors later rent a room for Dinah and Bailey at 23A Albert Square so that Dinah can have more assistance. Dinah and Karen become closer and Dinah confides in Karen that she can no longer deal with her multiple sclerosis and wants Karen to help her end her life. Karen refuses and reaches out to Darren (Kris Saunders), a man with multiple sclerosis so that he can speak to Dinah. Darren tells Karen that he used to be depressed but now he enjoys his life and agrees to speak to Dinah the following week. However, Dinah refuses and tells Karen that she doesn't want her condition to ruin her life and that she wants to be there for Bailey.

Unknown to Karen, Dinah plans on ending her own life and buys birthday cards where she writes her final messages to Bailey. Karen discovers this, but Dinah breaks down and reveals that she is scared she will not be able to survive any longer and Karen encourages her to not let her condition negatively impact her life any more. Dinah spends time with Bailey and the following day, Dinah seems better and thanks Karen for her help. Karen decides to take Bailey on a family trip to Walford Park, but Dinah decides to stay at home and says her last goodbye to Bailey. After she finishes writing her last birthday cards to Bailey, Dinah commits suicide and her body is discovered by Mitch.

Habiba Ahmed 

Habiba Ahmed, played by Rukku Nahar, makes her first appearance in episode 5871, originally broadcast on 19 February 2019. She is introduced alongside her sister, Iqra Ahmed (Priya Davdra), as the granddaughters of Arshad Ahmed (Madhav Sharma) and Mariam Ahmed (Indira Joshi).

Habiba arrives in Albert Square alongside her sister Iqra. They convince their uncle Masood that they can run Walford East which he agrees and leaves Walford for Tamwar's wedding. She spots Adam Bateman (Stephen Rahman-Hughes) and begin an affair while he is in a relationship with Honey Mitchell (Emma Barton). Adam constantly lets her down and shows that he does not love her. After realising that Adam has no intention of leaving Honey for her, she threatens him and ends their affair. The Ahmeds celebrate Eid where Adam and Iqra threaten each other and reveals that Iqra has a secret lover. Habiba is shocked at this, and confronts Iqra, who reveals that she is a lesbian. After having a heart-to-heart with Honey, Habiba feels sympathy towards her and warns her about Adam. To make Honey see sense, she reveals her affair with Adam while they were preparing a meal for Mariam after discovering she was mugged. She later begins a relationship with Jags Panesar (Amar Adatia). When they go public with their relationship, Jags' mother Suki Panesar (Balvinder Sopal) is unhappy and frames Jags for an attack he did not commit. Jags goes to prison and Habiba attempts to prove his innocence. Iqra struggles to support her and believes her girlfriend and Jags' sister Ash Panesar (Gurlaine Kaur Garcha) instead; Habiba tells her to choose between them. Iqra is speechless and Habiba gets in a taxi and leaves. She later gives birth to their son, Tyrion, on the same day that Jags is killed in prison.

The character and Nahar's casting were announced on 20 December 2018, along with that of Habiba's sister, Iqra. Both characters were called "feisty" and a BBC announcement stated that the "Defiant, smart and confident" sisters would "quickly make an impact on Walford". Habiba is described as "full of heart" and "bubbly", and she has "the best intentions" but it was said that "trouble never seems to be too far behind". Nahar said of her casting, "I'm so excited to have joined EastEnders, it's a show I've grown up watching and stepping onto Albert Square is just unreal! Habiba is great fun to play and I'm so happy to be working alongside Priya. Can't wait for you all to see what we get up to on the Square." Davdra confirmed on social media that the characters would appear from February 2019.

On 22 October 2020, Nahar made her final appearance as Habiba in previously unannounced scenes. Nahar confirmed her exit on Instagram, where she thanked EastEnders for teaching her "so much" during her tenure, and stated that she was "grateful" for the friendships she made on the programme.

Iqra Ahmed 

Iqra Ahmed, played by Priya Davdra, makes her first appearance in episode 5871, originally broadcast on 19 February 2019. She is introduced alongside her sister, Habiba Ahmed (Rukku Nahar), as the granddaughters of Arshad Ahmed (Madhav Sharma) and Mariam Ahmed (Indira Joshi).  Ash Kaur (Gurlaine Kaur Garcha) is introduced as Iqra's girlfriend. Iqra is the first Muslim lesbian to be featured on EastEnders.

Danny Hardcastle 

Danny Hardcastle, played by Paul Usher, made his first appearance in episode 5890, originally broadcast on 25 March 2019. Danny is introduced as a business associate of Phil Mitchell (Steve McFadden), as well as being involved with Keanu Taylor (Danny Walters). It was announced on 6 March 2019 that the character would appear for a "short period over the spring". Danny was introduced on 25 March 2019, departed on 25 April 2019 and returned on 16 March 2020 and departed again on 29 September 2020.

Danny is an acquaintance of Phil Mitchell (Steve McFadden) who has a connection to garages used for money laundering in Spain, which leads Phil into liquidation. He arrives in Walford to tell Phil that he needs to come up with an alternative way to launder money, after the business of the garages collapsed. Phil's son Ben Mitchell (Max Bowden) decides to meet up with Danny and threaten him into going into business with him. As revenge, Danny sends Midge (Tom Colley) to befriend Phil's daughter Louise Mitchell (Tilly Keeper) and kidnap her. Louise gets trapped in a container and is due to be taken into sex trade in Odessa, but the Mitchell's manage to rescue her. Phil confronts Danny and Danny reveals that it was a warning to Ben who threatened him and Danny insults him, causing Ben to almost attack him with a glassed cup. Danny later gives Phil another job offer, but Phil refuses and warns Danny never to contact him again.

Midge 

Midge, played by Tom Colley, makes his first appearance in episode 5891, broadcast on 26 March 2019. He bumps into Louise Mitchell (Tilly Keeper), causing her to spill coffee on herself. He offers to make it up to her but she declines. He later sees Keanu Taylor (Danny Walters) and when he sees Louise again, she sits with him and introduces Keanu to Midge, who says his name is short for Miguel as his mother is Spanish. Midge then meets with Louise's father, Phil Mitchell (Steve McFadden), who tells Midge not to mess around. It is revealed that Midge is a rival business owner of Phil's in Spain, that Phil stole business from when he set up garages in Spain and had Keanu working for him. Midge tells Phil he needs compensation and threatens Louise. Phil goes to hit Midge but Keanu stops him. Keanu then tells Phil that Midge was one of the people who tried to kill him in Spain. Some time later, Midge sees Louise in the pub and says it is nice to see her again. He then calls someone to say he has made contact with "the target" and in 24 hours "she will be history". The next day, Midge realises that Keanu is protecting Louise but after Louise and Keanu argue, he sits with Louise and when Keanu tried to find Louise, he sees Midge and some other men forcing her into a car and driving away at speed. Keanu informs Phil of what he has seen and Phil realises that Louise is being taken to a shipping container yard. Midge has his associates tie Louise's legs up and gag her and he threatens to throw acid in her face if she does not do as she is told, telling her that the shipping container is destined for Odessa, Ukraine. However, when Louise is tied up, Midge reveals it was water, not acid. Midge then locks her in the container. When Keanu finds Louise, Midge knocks him out and locks them both in the container. When Phil arrives, he attacks Midge and demands to know where Louise is. Midge almost overpowers Phil but Phil overpowers Midge and finds out where Louise is.

The character and Colley's casting were announced on 19 March 2019. Midge is described as "thug", "dodgy" and "nasty".

Chantelle Atkins

Chantelle Atkins (also Baker), played by Jessica Plummer, is the daughter of Karen Taylor (Lorraine Stanley) and Mitch Baker (Roger Griffiths). Chantelle first appears in Episode 5891, originally broadcast on 26 March 2019. It was announced on 20 December 2018 that the character would be joining the series in 2019, when senior executive producer Kate Oates commented, "The Taylor family are set to be complete when Chantelle arrives in Walford and Chantelle certainly has that feisty Taylor streak. Things are set to get a whole lot louder in Walford in 2019." Casting for the character was still taking place at the time. On 5 March 2019, it was announced that Plummer would be playing Chantelle. Further details about the character and her family, consisting of husband Gray Atkins (Toby-Alexander Smith) and their children Mia Atkins (Mahalia Malcolm) and Mackenzie Atkins (Isaac Lemonius), were announced on 11 March 2019. Of her casting, Plummer said, "Just like the majority of the UK, I grew up watching EastEnders. It's an absolute honour to be joining the cast with all my childhood favourites... Rickaaaaaaaay."

Producers used the characters of Chantelle and Gray to explore the topic of domestic violence as Gray is revealed to be attacking Chantelle. The show worked closely with Women's Aid in order to portray the issue sensitively and accurately. Plummer said: "I feel honoured to take on the responsibility of Chantelle's story. This is an issue that I, and everyone at EastEnders, hope we can raise awareness of. Many women and men that are in Chantelle's situation suffer in silence and we really hope that by showing this story we can highlight an issue and encourage those in similar situations to seek the help they need." The story results in the character being killed-off, highlighting the impact of the COVID-19 pandemic on domestic violence; Chantelle was killed by Gray in the episode broadcast on 18 September 2020. Plummer said: "It's been such a privilege to play Chantelle and to be able to tell her story. Sadly what she goes through is all too common and her death is a reminder of the devastating effect of domestic abuse. I've known it wasn't going to end well for Chantelle for a while now and although it was a shock to find out her fate, far too many men and women suffer in silence so I hope that by raising awareness we can ultimately save lives. I am so grateful to all the team and my lovely cast members for being so supportive, I'll miss Albert Square."

Chantelle arrives in Walford as a hairdresser who Kim Fox (Tameka Empson) contacts to work as a new hairdresser in her and her sister Denise Fox's (Diane Parish) new unisex salon. Chantelle does not actually know that she is auditioning for a job as she presumes that she was cutting someone's hair and that was all. Kim later offers Chantelle the job; she refuses at first, but then later agrees to help at the salon, but only part-time. During celebratory drinks in The Queen Victoria public house, Chantelle bumps into her father Mitch Baker (Roger Griffiths) who she has not seen for a long time. Chantelle later meets her mother Karen Taylor (Lorraine Stanley) and reconnects with her family. On the opening day of the salon, Chantelle gives a haircut to a man and he gives them £100. She crosses the man again in The Queen Vic and kisses him, and it is revealed that he is her husband Gray Atkins (Toby-Alexander Smith). With Gray's permission, Chantelle agrees to work at the salon and they plan on relocating to Walford with their children Mia and Mackenzie. Chantelle boasts about moving to 1 Albert Square, unaware that Kim once  lived there with her estranged husband Vincent Hubbard (Richard Blackwood), which causes hostility between the two women. Chantelle and Kim resolve their differences, but their feud ignites again when they argue over attending to Rainie Branning (Tanya Franks).

Chantelle and Gray's perfect relationship attracts attention in Walford. Chantelle's friend Whitney Dean (Shona McGarty) compliments her relationship with Gray and asks her for advice on her relationship to Callum "Halfway" Highway (Tony Clay); Honey Mitchell (Emma Barton) also compliments the couple and Chantelle's family warm up to Gray. However, the relationship turns out to be the opposite as it is revealed that Gray abuses Chantelle, which is first seen when Gray becomes angry at Mitch for cheating at the Walford 10K run and accuses Chantelle of laughing at him. Gray apologises to Chantelle and she later forgives him. Chantelle's brother Keegan Baker (Zack Morris) stays with the couple and, after becoming inspired by someone from Gray's workplace, decides that he wants to leave school. This causes a fight between Mitch and Gray, and Gray abuses Chantelle in response to his anger. Chantelle discovers she is pregnant and tells Gray. He reacts positively to the news and stops abusing her. She miscarries but decides not to tell Gray in fear of him abusing her. When he finds out Gray and Chantelle start to attending counselling sessions together even though she finds out he was involved in a fight. Gray suggests Chantelle and him try for another baby and reluctantly she agrees, the two of them also decide to renew their vows, however the venue pulls out the day before and although Chantelle says she does not want to renew their vows yet, Gray organises a surprise one at their home. After this, he says she vowed to do things for him and leads her upstairs against her will, saying they must try for a baby straight away. Chantelle is later abused by Gray for not informing him of the miscarriage and later abuses her again when the pregnancy tests come back negative.

After months of abuse during lockdown (which included being forced to spend two minutes under the water in the bath), Chantelle finally decides to divorce Gray and take the kids with her but something always got in her way. Gray's demanding behaviour worsens when he realises something suspicious is going on. He suspects she is having an affair with her friend and boss at her secondary job, Kheerat Panesar (Jaz Deol) and he starts to watch them in the car. He also finds out she is divorcing him when a divorce lawyer advert pops up on his computer after Chantelle met up with one, according to a tracker app he installed on her phone.

Just as Chantelle gets ready to leave for Hastings with her children to start a new life, Gray appears and ruins her plan. Another escape opportunity comes for Chantelle when her parents offer her and the kids a trip to a B&B in Southend and Chantelle agrees desperate to get away from Gray. However, Gray persuades Karen and Mitch to let the kids stay at home and have just Chantelle go. Devastated, Chantelle is miserable throughout the holiday and Mitch suspects that something is wrong so he asks her and she tells him it's because she misses her children. Mitch tells Chantelle he will go and get them but when he returns, the children aren't the only ones with him. Gray comes along too. Excited to see her children, Chantelle is again ready to leave with them, when Gray turns up and ruins her plans again. Earlier, Gray overheard Chantelle on the phone to Kheerat while in a Southend cafe, asking him to sneak into the house to get a memorial box of the Mia and Mackenzie's belongings (which Chantelle had problems fitting into the suitcase, so had left the box under the bed).

Gray sets up the alarm in the house and when Kheerat breaks in, Gray is alerted on his phone and tells Chantelle that they need to go home because someone has broken in. Chantelle tells him she will stay with Mia and Mackenzie but he insists they all go home. Mitch realises something isn't right and tells Chantelle she does not have to go and that Gray can manage on his own but Gray glares at her and she decides to go with Gray and says a final goodbye to her parents as she realises she may not see them again.

Chantelle and Gray arrive back home, which Kheerat has managed to flee. Chantelle tucks Mia and Mackenzie in for the night, not knowing it is the last time she will see them. Gray notices messages from Kheerat and starts threatening Chantelle, Mia and Mackenzie after she denies cheating, however she manages to calm him down and get him to go to bed. While he is gone, Chantelle calls Kheerat to ask for help, this being after Gray threatened her into leaving Kheerat a message saying she wants to stay with her husband. Upon hearing this, his phone battery dies, making it impossible for him to answer and she is caught by Gray. She yells at Gray, telling him she is not scared of his abusive ways anymore, is glad she miscarried his baby as she did not want to bring another child of an abuser into the world and that she does not love him and that if he doesn't let her leave with her children, she will scream until everyone hears. However this angers Gray more and he forcefully shoves Chantelle backwards into an open dishwasher, impaling her on knives and crockery, leaving her unable to move. As she lies there dying, a shocked Gray leaves the house to set up an alibi. He returns just as Chantelle dies, and then starts to set up her death as an accident, placing a toy car to make it look like she slipped on it.

Reception

Plummer was shortlisted for Best Newcomer at the 2019 Inside Soap Awards but lost out to Maureen Lipman (who plays Evelyn Plummer in Coronation Street). Plummer came second in the category for Best Soap Newcomer at the 2019 Digital Spy Reader Awards. Plummer won Best Actress at the 2020 Inside Soap Awards for her portrayal of Chantelle. At the 2020 Digital Spy Reader Awards, Plummer won Best Soap Actor (Female) and Chantelle's death was voted Most Devastating Death.

Gray Atkins

Gray Atkins, played by Toby-Alexander Smith, is introduced as the husband of Chantelle Atkins (Jessica Plummer). The character and Smith's casting were announced on 11 March 2019. Gray is described as a "hard-working solicitor in London whose success took Chantelle away from Taylor Towers years earlier". Smith said of his casting, "I'm delighted to be joining the cast of EastEnders as I've always been a fan. I'm looking forward to seeing what Albert Square has in store for Gray." Gray made his first appearance on 29 March 2019. On 22 February 2022, it was announced that Gray would be leaving EastEnders, and he departed on 10 March 2022.

On 12 July 2019, it was revealed that Gray domestically abuses Chantelle, with EastEnders working closely with Women's Aid in order to portray the issue sensitively and accurately. Smith said: "Chantelle and Gray's journey is about to take a huge turn for the audience. This storyline will depict how hidden from sight domestic abuse remains even today. To the unaware eye Gray appears to be a loving husband and a committed father; but his charm is a front for the power and control he exerts over Chantelle – an experience all too common to thousands of women up and down the country today. Domestic abuse, in all its forms is against the law and is shrouded in secrecy. I hope that by tackling such a sensitive subject matter we can raise awareness of the importance of changing societal values so that both women and men's rights to live free from abuse, invasion, disempowerment and intimidation are respected." On 6 September 2020, it was announced that Gray would kill Chantelle at the conclusion of the domestic abuse storyline, highlighting the impact of the COVID-19 pandemic on domestic violence. Smith said: "We hope that Chantelle's story gives people the courage to speak out before it's too late and to know that there are services out there to help. Working with Women's Aid and Refuge has been invaluable in understanding the mindset of an abuser and the awful realities of abusive relationships. With such a tragic ending bound to be shocking for the audience, hopefully it serves as an important reminder of the devastation domestic abuse causes, especially at the moment. Working with Jessica has been wonderful, she'll be greatly missed and I am so thankful that we're part of such an important story together."

Speaking on ITV's Loose Women, Smith discussed the soap's deliberate move to announce the storyline ahead of time, to which he replied: "I think they were coming from the angle of... you know, what's gonna have the biggest impact? Obviously we could've left it as a surprise, but ultimately it could've been a massive trigger for a lot of survivors out there watching it. If there's anyone at home who's sitting next to someone who is potentially a perpetrator as well, that could be very scary and very dangerous, so I think it was definitely the safest thing for them to do." Smith also revealed that people have struggled to differentiate him from his character, explaining: "It got very loud on social media. People struggled for a while to differentiate me as an actor and the character Gray Atkins. There's still a lot of that, and potentially a lot more to come. But, to be honest, I've got my head around that. If it means people are talking about the storyline, calling the character out on his behaviour, and if it's getting people out of these domestic abuse relationships, then, you know, it's fine."

Gray first appeared in early 2019 when he arrives at Albert Square with his wife Chantelle and their two children, Mack and Mia, to start anew together. He is known to be a hard-working solicitor who seemingly appears devoted to his wife and their children. However, it soon emerges that Gray is a violent man who domestically abuses Chantelle on certain amount of occasions; the follow-up of such incident implies that he rape her after forcing her to go upstairs with him to bed. Soon enough he befriends local resident Whitney Dean (Shona McGarty) and they start a romantic friendship togwther; Gray later legally represents Whitney after she killed her stalker, Leo King (Tom Wells) in self defence.

By 2020, Gray's prolonging abuse towards Chantelle has reached boiling point. She eventually decides to leave with their children and her secret crush, Kheerat Panesar (Jaz Deol), in an attempt to escape her ordeal; however, Gray discovers her plan and confronts Chantelle on the night she is supposed to leave. Chantelle stands up to Gray and demands that he let her leave, but Gray refuses and ends up shoving her onto a knife-packed dishwasher in a fit of rage. Chantelle is fatally impaled from the impact and she dies from blood loss after Gray, despite his fault, chooses to watch her succumb to her injuries rather than provide help; Gray then stages the scene to make Chantelle's death appear that she died in a horrific accident. Over the next few days, an upset Gray struggles with his guilt and briefly considers turning himself into the police for his crimes. He even comes close to killing himself and his kids by attempting to fill his flat with gas fumes with his lighter, but is stopped by fellow neighbour Shirley Carter (Linda Henry) when she sees him struggling to cope; Shirley manages to convince Gray to move forward with his life and support his kids in Chantelle's honour.

He later grows even closer with Whitney when she becomes his child minder. Shirley later stays with Gray and is joined by her sister Tina Carter (Luisa Bradshaw-White), who grows suspicious of Gray's behaviour. When she is accused of attacking Ian Beale (Adam Woodyatt) at The Queen Victoria public house, Gray briefly volunteers to legally represent her. However, when she starts telling other people about his aggressive behaviour, Gray deliberately puts Tina in the frame by stopping a pizza delivery man from going to the police with an alibi. He packs Tina's stuff and tells her she needs to run, but her growing suspicions towards him causes Tina to learn that Gray had abused and killed Chantelle. She attempts to leave and expose him to the Square, but Gray stops her and strangles her to death. He then dumps her body and tells Shirley, along with her son Mick Carter (Danny Dyer), that Tina has gone on the run. When Shirley grows suspicious of Gray over the circumstances behind Tina's whereabouts, he pays a homeless woman to shoplift and pretend to be Tina.

In 2021, Gray becomes increasingly obsessed with Whitney and is jealous when she forms a relationship with her boyfriend Kush Kazemi (Davood Ghadami); his envy grows as Whitney later becomes engaged to Kush. Soon enough, Gray gets involved in Kush's situation with the square's reigning hardman/criminal kingpin Phil Mitchell (Steve McFadden) and his son Ben (Max Bowden) - as Kush had helped the Mitchells and Shirley perpetuate a car robbery several months ago. Kush grasses up the Mitchells in exchange for his freedom and plans to run away with Whitney, but Gray confronts Kush at the train station about stealing Whitney away from him. Gray accuses Kush of ruining Whitney's life and the pair end up having a scuffle, which results in Gray on the tracks. Kush frantically pulls Gray up to safety just in time, but then Gray thereupon pushes Kush in front of the oncoming train - killing him as a result. Gray then flees the station and looks as have gotten away with murder again once Kush's death becomes public knowledge by the next day. Whitney assumes Phil and Ben had Kush killed for grassing them up, and accidentally runs over Phil's romantic partner Kat Slater (Jessie Wallace) with Gray's car in an attempt to attack Phil and Ben for their supposed actions. Gray is able to avoid getting Whitney into trouble, but later cuts ties with her in a furious outburst.

Months later, Gray starts a relationship with Whitney's friend Chelsea Fox (Zaraah Abrahams). Later on he gets reacquainted with his estranged boss Laura Awoyinka (Sarah Paul), who seems to dislike Gray and she even warns Chelsea about him later on. When Gray learns what Laura is doing, he retaliates by sending her messages under the pseudonym Jasper. He later gets a police caution for public indecency with Chelsea and, due to this along with the online messages, he gets fired from the solicitor firm. Chelsea also dumps him after he rages at her for inadvertently buying Chantelle's ring from a pawn shop.

Weeks later, Gray informs Shirley and Mick that he saw Tina being bundled onto a bus. He texts Shirley from a burner phone, pretending to be Tina and telling her to send him £10k, as he is in financial ruin after losing his job. When Phil gets arrested for the attack on Ian later on, Gray visits Ben and offers to represent Phil. The Mitchells agree to Gray's help and he manages to get Phil released, much to Shirley's outrage as she assumes that Phil is responsible for Tina's situation; she later confronts Gray for helping the Mitchells before going on to attack Phil with a baseball bat when wanting answers about Tina.

Sometime later, Gray woos Chelsea into reconciling with him and they later get engaged. But then Whitney finds a secret online forum that Chantelle made against her husband over his abusive nature, which causes Whitney to conclude that Gray had been abusing Chantelle for months before he ended up killing her on the night of her death. She tells Kheerat on this and they plan to stop Chelsea from marrying Gray, but this fails and the pair get married; however, Chelsea later discovers the forum that causes her to know what Gray did to Chantelle.

In 2022, Chelsea's plan to escape Gray fails when she gets pregnant with their child and she gives birth; the child is named Jordan and she agrees to let Gray help raise her baby, but assures Whitney that she still intends to bring him to justice for what happened to Chantelle. Later on in March that year, Kheerat attempts to get a confession from Gray over Chantelle. But he fails when Gray attacks Kheerat; they fight and Kheerat knocks Gray unconscious before going on the run. A few days later, Tina's body is discovered and both Shirley and Mick are devastated when the police inform them of the tragedy. When Whitney learns about Tina's death, she speculates that Gray killed her and informs both Mick and Shirley of her theory; the two agree over this not only due to their own suspicions on Gray, but also when Whitney explains her other theory that Gray had abused and killed Chantelle. It is then Chantelle's parents, Karen Taylor (Lorraine Stanley) and Mitch Baker (Roger Griffiths), learn about Tina's death and all the accusations against Gray. The couple each have different responses as Karen instantly believes Gray, whereas Mitch knows he is guilty when Whitney tells him the truth about Chantelle.

Upon learning that Tina's body has been found and that her death is confirmed, Gray begins to fear that his arrest is inevitable; he plans to escape with his children and Chelsea along with Jordan. He is able to trick Karen into believing his innocence and keeping Jordan hidden at her house. But when Chelsea confronts him that night, Gray admits to killing Chantelle. She seemingly decides to run away with him anyways, but then Gray realizes that Chelsea has recorded her confession to the police. He promptly attacks Chelsea and nearly chokes her to death, but she fends him off and he flees when the police break into his house. Gray goes to collect his children from Karen, but her growing suspicions leads him to admit what he did to Chantelle. She disowns Gray, as do his children, and he is forced to abandon them when Karen alerts the police of his presence. Gray then runs into The Vic, where both Shirley and Mick attack him in revenge for Tina's murder. Shirley attempts to strangle Gray to death when Mick stops her, insisting that Gray needs to face justice for his crimes. Gray uses the opportunity to distract the two, knocking Shirley unconscious and forcing Mick to let him flee in order to help his mother.

Moments later, Gray is spotted by Whitney. She chases him to a railway bridge and they end up having a verbal confrontation when she confronts him. Gray attempts to dismiss Whitney's views on his character by insulting her, but she ignores him with persistence that he will go to prison for killing both Chantelle and Tina. Not wanting to go to prison, though, Gray attempts suicide. Whitney stops him and is determined not to see him take the easy way out. Gray attempts to goad Whitney into letting him go by confessing to Kush's murder. Whitney is horrified, but is unfazed as she struggles to keep hold of Gray when he threatens to take her to her death with him. Whitney nearly loses her grip, but then Mitch intervenes and helps Whitney force Gray up to safety; Mitch thereupon grabs Gray and looks angrily determined to hurt him to avenge Chantelle's death, but instead allows the police to apprehend him. In the end, Gray is finally arrested for his crimes and he is taken into a police car and sent to prison.

Reception
Smith was shortlisted for Best Villain at the 2020 Inside Soap Awards but lost out to Ian Bartholomew (who plays Geoff Metcalfe in Coronation Street). Smith won Best Villain at the 2021 Version Soap Awards for his portrayal of Gray.

Mia Atkins 

Mia Atkins, played by Mahalia Malcolm, is the daughter of Chantelle Atkins (Jessica Plummer) and Gray Atkins (Toby-Alexander Smith). The character and casting were announced on 11 March 2019. Mia made her first appearance on 12 April.

Mia's parents married after a whirlwind romance when they found out they were expecting her. They had little contact with the Taylor family until arriving in Walford in 2019 when Chantelle is offered a job at Denise Fox's (Diane Parish) hair salon. Mia and Mackenzie enjoy spending time with their grandmother Karen Taylor (Lorraine Stanley) and are delighted when their father buys No. 1 Albert Square so they can be closer to their family. Shortly after this Mia meets her grandfather Mitch Baker (Roger Griffiths) for the first time when he wrongly assumes Gray is harassing Chantelle at The Queen Victoria public house. Mia and Mackenzie have no idea that Gray is abusing Chantelle and after returning home from a family holiday to Southend, they are devastated to find out that Chantelle has died. Unbeknownst to them, Chantelle was killed during an altercation with Gray. Mia and Mackenzie move in with Karen at Shirley Carter's (Linda Henry) insistence after she uncovers Gray's plot to kill himself and the children. Over the next 18 months Mack and Mia are looked after by a number of residents; initially Shirley and her sister Tina Carter (Luisa Bradshaw-White), followed by live-in nanny Whitney Dean (Shona McGarty) and then Gray's girlfriend Chelsea Fox (Zaraah Abrahams). Chelsea is not interested in Gray's children and frequently neglects them, resulting in Mia asking to stay with the Taylor's. This changes when Chelsea becomes pregnant by Gray and they get engaged, resulting in her making the effort to get to know her future stepchildren. Chelsea later gives birth prematurely to Mack and Mia's half-brother Jordan in December 2021. After Gray is arrested for the murders of Chantelle, Tina and Kush Kazemi (Davood Ghadami) in March 2022, Mack and Mia start living with grandparents Karen and Mitch on a permanent basis.

Mackenzie Atkins 

Mackenzie Atkins, played by Isaac Lemonius, is the son of Chantelle Atkins (Jessica Plummer) and Gray Atkins (Toby-Alexander Smith). The character and casting were announced on 11 March 2019. Mackenzie made his first appearance on 12 April.

Daniel Cook

Daniel Cook, played by Ade Edmondson, is a love interest of Jean Slater (Gillian Wright). The character and Edmondson's casting were announced on 9 May 2019. He began appearing on 25 June 2019.

Daniel is first seen at Walford General, being difficult with the nurses, as witnessed by Jean Slater (Gillian Wright) and her daughter, Stacey Fowler (Lacey Turner). He later approaches Jean and attempts to initiate a conversation, but accidentally makes an offensive comment which causes Jean to slap him. Stacey later confronts him about making Jean angry. Daniel continues to be seen each time Jean visits the hospital and they start to grow close. In September 2019, Daniel reveals that his cancer has returned and is now terminal, and Jean promises to care for him. As her feelings for Daniel begin to blossom, and she gets excited about introducing him to Stacey, Jean receives a call from Daniel's neighbour saying that Daniel has died, having been discovered at his home. Jean attends his memorial alongside Kush Kazemi (Davood Ghadami), but it is revealed that Daniel faked his own death because he felt that he was getting too emotionally involved with Jean and did not want to put her through the pain of watching him die slowly. Two months later, Kush visits the hospital to give some magazines on Jean's behalf and bumps into Daniel. He persuades him to come back to Walford and tell Jean the truth but he refuses. Kush gives up and says goodbye.

On Christmas Day, Daniel returns to Walford contemplating telling Jean the truth when he discovers the Panesar brothers demanding back rent money from the Slaters in exchange for them not being evicted from their house. He quickly pays for the rent himself and re-introduces himself to Jean, who is furious at him for faking his death. She asks him for an explanation as to why he did it; he admits that it is because he was falling in love with her and knowing she was falling for him as well, he did not want her to go through the pain of saying goodbye to him on his deathbed. Touched, she kisses him passionately and assures him she will help him live out the rest of his time as fulfilling as possible. Daniel and Jean prank funeral directors Rainie Branning (Tanya Franks) and Stuart Highway (Ricky Champ) into thinking he is dying and wants a lavish funeral, guilt tripping them into giving them a ride in a horse driven carriage. However, when Daniel laters discovers he has weeks to live, he arranges a real funeral with Rainie.

When Daniel's condition worsens, he refuses going into a hospice, and promises Jean that he will hold onto his life until she is cancer free. Jean goes to an appointment accompanied by Mo Harris (Laila Morse), and finds out her cancer has gone. When Daniel asks about the appointment, she tells him that they have not got her results yet. However, Mo reveals that Jean is cancer free. The pair sit on a bench together, and he sends her away to get a hot chocolate; when she returns, Daniel has died.

Jonno Highway 

Jonno Highway, played by Richard Graham, is the father of Stuart Highway (Ricky Champ) and Callum Highway (Tony Clay). Jonno began appearing as a guest on 1 July 2019.

Jonno is first seen after being contacted by his son Callum's fiancée, Whitney Dean (Shona McGarty). He has a disagreement with Ben Mitchell (Max Bowden) over gay pride and is confronted by his father, Phil (Steve McFadden). It is revealed that Jonno was not a good father to Callum or Stuart and would be violent towards Stuart. He reveals that he has changed and attempts to reconcile with his family. Jonno confronts Ben in the toilets and expresses his disgust with homosexuals, causing a fight between him and Ben. Jonno's true colours are exposed and Stuart threatens him out of Walford. Jonno returns two months later, wanting to find out how Callum's wedding went. When he discovers that the wedding was called off he confronts Callum about it, and Callum comes out as gay to his father. Disgusted, Jonno accuses Ben of turning him into "one of them", earning himself a punch from Phil in return.

Sheree Trueman 

Sheree Trueman, played by Suzette Llewellyn, is the third wife of Patrick Trueman (Rudolph Walker). The character and Llewellyn's casting were announced on 18 June 2019. Sheree made her first appearance on 2 August 2019. On 30 September 2021 Sheree made an unannounced exit from the show.

Sheree arrives in Walford with Patrick after his return from Trinidad where they reveal that they are now married. It is explained that Sheree has known Patrick for a long time. Denise Fox (Diane Parish), finds herself unable to trust her, and is left concerned for Patrick's wellbeing whilst being annoyed by her antics at their salon. After Ted Murray (Christopher Timothy) accidentally kisses Sheree in The Queen Victoria public house, Sheree arranges for Ted to meet her mother Wanda Baptiste (Anni Domingo). This results in Ted deciding to leave Walford with her but, as they are leaving, Sheree reveals to Denise that Wanda had previously faced questions from the police over the death of her last husband. Denise's worries increase with the discovery of a voicemail from Ted appearing to show him panicking, and she confronts Sheree about her mother. Sheree dismisses the allegations of her mother harming Ted, who is later revealed to be fine, but Denise remains convinced that something isn't right with her and remains adamant to find out what.

Denise overhears Sheree on the phone to a man named Isaac (Stevie Basaula), and assumes that she is cheating on Patrick. Denise confronts her and tells her to leave. However, when Isaac turns up in Walford, it is revealed that he is Sheree's son.

Shyanna 

Shyanna, played by Anita Harris, appears on 26 August 2019. The character and Harris's casting were announced on 9 August 2019.

Shyanna is a psychic who Bailey Baker (Kara-Leah Fernandes) contacts to feel closer to her deceased mother, Dinah Wilson (Anjela Lauren Smith). Although Bailey's half-siblings, Chantelle Atkins (Jessica Plummer) and Keegan Baker (Zack Morris), tell Bailey that psychics do not exist and it is a con, Bailey still wants to try. Shyanna explains that Dinah can only speak through her and says that Dinah is sorry for how she died and is free of her struggles. Shyanna says that Bailey has found a new family and spent a lot of time alone with Dinah before that. Bailey asks what Dinah's favourite colour was, to which Shyanna says blue. Bailey says Dinah hated the colour blue and says she made lucky guesses based on what she had found out about Bailey. Bailey says it was a waste of her time and leaves. Shyanna then asks Chantelle for payment and tells her that her home has a "vibe" that Chantelle cannot fight alone and if she does, things will get "very dark". Shyanna then leaves.

Ash Panesar 

Ash Panesar (also Kaur), played by Gurlaine Kaur Garcha, made her first appearance on 29 August 2019. Ash is introduced as the bisexual Sikh girlfriend of Iqra Ahmed (Priya Davdra), with whom she has been in a relationship with for over a year. Ash's identity was kept a secret due to Iqra being entered into an arranged marriage with a man. In August 2019, Iqra introduces Ash to Arshad (Madhav Sharma) and Mariam Ahmed (Indira Joshi), where she explains that Ash is a doctor. When the pair are in the club, Iqra introduces Ash as a friend which bothers Ash. When she brings up her annoyance with it, Iqra pulls her into a kiss in front of the Walford residents. In October 2019, it is revealed that Ash is the sister of Kheerat (Jaz Deol), Jags (Amar Adatia) and Vinny (Shiv Jalota). Vinny tells Ash that their mother is dying from cancer, to which she refuses to visit her. It is then revealed that when she was 19, Ash had an abortion which caused her to fall out with her mother and Kheerat. As part of a "wife swap" event, Ash stays with Honey Mitchell (Emma Barton) for a few days. During her time there, she notices that Honey has an eating disorder, and encourages to get professional help. She later witnesses Honey throw Adam out, who is revealed to have known about her eating disorder but didn't care. Ash stops Iqra from getting involved, and the pair cheer for Honey for standing up for herself when she confronts Adam. When Kheerat, Jags and Vinny move into a house in Walford, Kheerat tries to make amends with Ash. He apologises for disagreeing with her abortion, but when she introduces him to Iqra, he disapproves of Ash dating a Muslim.

On her casting, Garcha said "I am thrilled to be a part of the Panesar family! Punjabi families are full of character, really loving and caring so I'm excited to be involved in portraying that to the nation. I do think there is a shortage for representation of Punjabi families especially on TV so it's amazing to be a member of Walford's first Punjabi family." Initially only hired as a guest star during the summer of 2019, Garcha's contract was upgraded for her to become a series regular. Garcha expressed her delight to play a bisexual character, stating: "It is nice to know when someone can relate to your role and storyline. It is very rewarding as an actor when you feel like you're helping people and then giving them a sense of comfort, so they know they are not alone". Garcha stated that her most memorable part of starting filming on EastEnders was her scene in The Queen Victoria, describing it as a "famous landmark that is part of our television culture. She added that Ash's future storylines are "very exciting", with "lots of drama". In an interview with Inside Soap, Garcha recalled talking to her Taekwondo instructor about her character. Garca told them that when she was auditioning for the role, she felt that she can relate to Ash, since she is "strong, kind, has her head screwed on, and knows what she wants". She also stated that Ash "isn't afraid to speak her mind". Garcha also noted Ash's "toxic" relationship with mother Suki, stating that when "Ash is happy, Suki's not happy", and despite Ash thinking Suki is evil, she teased that "Ash more like Suki than she wants to admit". When asked what she would want for Ash in the future, Garcha stated that she "love for Ash to keep unravelling".

On 30 January 2023, it was announced that Ash would be leaving the show after three and a half years and will be written out in the spring. Her exit scenes aired on 8 March 2023.

Leo King 

Leo King, played by Tom Wells, makes his first appearance on 3 September 2019. He was unnamed until episode 5990 on 9 September 2019. Details of the character and storyline were also announced on the same day. Leo is the son of paedophile Tony King (Chris Coghill), who abused Whitney Dean (Shona McGarty) as a child. Wells expressed his delight in joining the cast, adding, "I'm really excited to be joining the EastEnders team and seeing what's in store for Leo". Wells also commented that "He's definitely a man not to be trusted". Executive producer Jon Sen also added "Bianca's return sparks a gripping new story with the arrival of Leo King – a dark and misguided figure who has grown up with the stigma of being the son of a convicted paedophile. We are thrilled to welcome Tom to the Square, knowing he will bring depth and complexity to the role of Leo, a man who believes his father has been wronged and who will also go to great lengths to prove it". The character was killed-off in February 2020; his departure had not been announced beforehand. On-screen, Whitney stabs Leo in self defence after he tries attacking her with a knife.

Leo first appears as a guest at Whitney's wedding to Callum "Halfway" Highway (Tony Clay). He talks to Whitney's stepsister, Tiffany Butcher (Maisie Smith), and proceeds into pecking her cheek, which is witnessed by Tiffany's mother Bianca Jackson (Patsy Palmer). Bianca warns Leo to stay away. However, Leo arrives in Walford and begins menacing Bianca. It is revealed that he is the son of Bianca's ex-boyfriend Tony and believes that Whitney had lied about Tony sexually abusing her. He threatens Bianca about money his grandmother had left him and threatens to hurt both Whitney and Tiffany if he does not receive the money.

Whitney returns to Walford and announces that she been talking to a new man. The man is revealed to be Leo and he picks her up in his car. Leo and Whitney's fling continues, however Whitney introduces him to Tiffany whom he had kissed during Whitney's wedding. Tiffany reveals his identity, but Whitney continues to meet with him. Whilst in E20, Whitney confides with Leo about her past relationships and he tries to push for more information about her relationship with his father, but he fails to get it. Soon afterwards Whitney tells him that she is not after a relationship. In an attempt to drive Whitney and Callum apart, Leo finds a video of Callum doing nothing when his friend attempts to rape an unconscious girl at a party.

Leo confronts Whitney on a balcony, and when Kush Kazemi (Davood Ghadami) sees them, he goes to help Whitney, but accidentally pushes Leo over the balcony. While in hospital, Whitney visits him in the hope that he will not press charges against Kush. He finds a notebook in her bag, detailing all of their interactions. Leo makes Whitney go into the pub and tell everyone that Tony was innocent, and leaves. He begins hiding in Whitney's loft, spying on her from a hole in the ceiling. When she is alone, he confronts her, and the pair fight, ending in Whitney stabbing him in self defence. His dead body is left on her kitchen floor.

Wanda Baptiste 

Wanda Baptiste, played by Anni Domingo, is the mother of Sheree Trueman (Suzette Llewellyn). Upon Wanda's arrival, Sheree arranges a date between her Ted Murray (Christopher Timothy). Wanda later announces that she has booked a ticket to go travelling for a year, and has a spare ticket, to which Ted agrees to accompany her. When the pair are gone, Sheree reveals that Wanda's ex-husband died under mysterious pretences, concerning Denise Fox (Diane Parish).

Charlie "Tubbs" Savage 

Charlie "Tubbs" Savage, played by Tayla Kovacevic-Ebong, is an associate of Ben Mitchell (Max Bowden). Tubbs is a loan shark who shared a cell with Ben when he was imprisoned for the murder of Heather Trott (Cheryl Fergison). When Ben sees Tubbs loaning Karen Taylor (Lorraine Stanley) money, Ben asks Tubbs to keep him informed as his sister, Louise Mitchell (Tilly Keeper), is engaged to Karen's eldest son, Keanu Taylor (Danny Walters). Tubbs, alongside Martin Fowler (James Bye), raid the house of a woman who owes money. Tubbs and Martin realize that they have been set up and Martin brutally attacks one of the men. Tubbs and Ben are arrested when Martin confesses to Jack Branning (Scott Maslen) that they have been operating in illegal activities. As revenge, Ben orders Tubbs and his gang to torment Martin and they dangle him over a railway bridge. When Ben's boyfriend Callum "Halfway" Highway (Tony Clay) decides to become a police officer, Ben quits organised crime, and hands over the business to Tubbs, who rehires Martin.

Jags Panesar

Jags Panesar, played by Amar Adatia, made his first appearance on 4 October 2019. He is the second eldest of the three Panesar brothers, the others being Kheerat (Jaz Deol) and Vinny (Shiv Jalota). The family is described as a British Asian family of Punjabi Sikh heritage. The character and Adatia's casting were announced on 21 August 2019. Jags is described as someone who "has always struggled in the shadow of his older brother and despite his best intentions, nothing ever seems to go to plan for try-hard Jags leaving Kheerat and the rest of the family constantly unimpressed." Producer Jon Sen said of the family "The Panesar family are set arrive this autumn and will bring their own unique blend of charm and chaos onto the Square. A British Asian family of Punjabi Sikh heritage, Kheerat, Jags and Vinny are three very different brothers who turn up in Walford looking to settle a score – however, fate quickly takes a hand and they find themselves staying for good. We're thrilled to be introducing this vibrant new family to Walford and to be sharing their stories." Of his casting, Adatia said, "My younger self would never have believed I'd be on EastEnders. It's pretty amazing to be part of one of the most iconic television shows alongside some of the best actors in the business. I really am so grateful." On 26 September 2020, it was announced that Adatia would be departing from his role as Jags as part of a "dark storyline". Adatia made his final appearance in an episode broadcast on 9 October 2020. The character was killed off-screen on 24 June 2021.

Jags and Kheerat first arrive in Walford to confront Ben Mitchell (Max Bowden) after he steals Kheerat's car. They threaten him with retaliation unless the car is returned to them. When Ben fails to deliver, Jags kidnaps Lola Pearce (Danielle Harold), though he is berated by Kheerat for this and later lets her go after Ben comes to meet them and promises to repay them. A few weeks later, the brothers arrive on the Square in search of their sister Ash Kaur (Gurlaine Kaur Garcha). While there, Jags notices Chantelle Atkins (Jessica Plummer) stood at a bus stop, and tells Kheerat that he used to have a crush on her at school, and that they went on a date. The Panesars later move to Walford and are eventually joined by their mother Suki (Balvinder Sopal). When Suki is revealed to have lied about having cancer, Jags is the first of the family to forgive her.

Jags gets close to and eventually enters a secret relationship with Habiba Ahmed (Rukku Nahar), though he fears Suki's reaction and decides against going public. In September 2020, Vinny attacks Martin Fowler (James Bye) in a botched staged robbery, and Jags helps to clear up the evidence. After challenging his family's treatment of their tenants, Jags goes public about his relationship with Habiba. Enraged, Suki hands Jags' bloody jeans into the police, accusing him of attacking Martin. Jags is wrongfully arrested and reluctantly agrees to plead guilty for the crime. He is sentenced to 4 years in prison. Months later, the Panesars learn that Jags has gotten on the wrong side of a gang in prison, and Kheerat makes an agreement with Ben to arrange protection for him. However, Ben later calls off the protection in an act of rage, and the Panesars learn shortly afterwards that Jags has been killed in an attack in his cell.

Kheerat Panesar

Kheerat Panesar, played by Jaz Singh Deol, made his first appearance on 4 October 2019. He is the eldest of three brothers, the others being Jags (Amar Adatia) and Vinny (Shiv Jalota). The family is described as a British Asian family of Punjabi Sikh heritage. The character and Deol's casting were announced on 21 August 2019. Kheerat is described as a "successful businessman who knows exactly what he wants and how to get it" and that he "uses his persuasiveness and charm to his advantage in every situation" Producer Jon Sen said of the family "The Panesar family are set arrive this autumn and will bring their own unique blend of charm and chaos onto the Square. A British Asian family of Punjabi Sikh heritage, Kheerat, Jags and Vinny are three very different brothers who turn up in Walford looking to settle a score – however, fate quickly takes a hand and they find themselves staying for good. We're thrilled to be introducing this vibrant new family to Walford and to be sharing their stories." Of his casting, Deol said, "I'm very proud and excited to be joining such an iconic show and bringing to life a character that is a reflection of the cultural background that I and many others come from in today's modern Britain. I can't wait to get started and for viewers to meet the Panesars." Deol made an unannounced departure from the show on 10 November 2022, when Kheerat confessed to murder.

Kheerat and Jags first arrive in Walford to confront Ben Mitchell (Max Bowden) after he steals Kheerat's car. They threaten retaliation unless the car is returned. When Ben fails to deliver, Jags kidnaps Lola Pearce (Danielle Harold), but Kheerat berates him for this and later agrees to let her go after Ben promises to repay them. Kheerat threatens Ben and Lola's daughter Lexi Pearce (Isabella Brown) as they are leaving. A few weeks later, the Panesar brothers arrive on the Square in search of their sister Ash Kaur (Gurlaine Kaur Garcha). Kheerat reveals that Ash had an abortion years ago, disapproving of her actions and accusing her of "murdering her own baby". When Kheerat, Jags and Vinny move into a flat belonging to Adam Bateman (Stephen Rahman-Hughes), Kheerat attempts to make amends with Ash. He apologises for disagreeing with her abortion, but upon discovering Ash's girlfriend, Iqra Ahmed (Priya Davdra), is a Muslim, he expresses more disapproval with Ash. He falls in love with old acquaintance Chantelle Atkins (Jessica Kate Plummer) after employing her at the Panesar call centre, unaware she is trapped in an abusive marriage to Gray Atkins (Toby-Alexander Smith). They plan to run away together but Kheerat is devastated to learn that she has died in a tragic accident. He later has a one-night stand with Stacey Slater (Lacey Turner) after they spend a night drinking and confiding in each other about their relationship woes. After Vinny attacks Martin Fowler (James Bye) and it is revealed that Jags is in a secret relationship with Habiba Ahmed (Rukku Nahar) and no longer wants to be involved in the family business, Kheerat is dismayed to learn that his mother Suki Panesar (Balvinder Sopal) has arranged for Jags to be arrested for Vinny's crime. Habiba leaves Walford to be nearer to Jags in prison and when Kheerat discovers she is pregnant he decides to pay for her flat and towards the upkeep of the baby out of guilt for what his mother has done. At the same time Kheerat enters a relationship with Sharon Watts (Letitia Dean). They decide to keep their romance a secret due to the fact that Sharon's former stepson Ben is being paid by Kheerat to ensure Jags has protection in prison. However, when Ben catches them together he decides to call off Jags' protection and Kheerat is later devastated to learn that Jags has been killed in a prison fight.

Vinny Panesar

Vinny Panesar, played by Shiv Jalota, made his first appearance on 29 October 2019. He is the youngest of the Panesar brothers, the others being Kheerat (Jaz Deol) and Jags (Amar Adatia). The family is described as a British Asian family of Punjabi Sikh heritage. The character and Jalota's casting were announced on 21 August 2019. Vinny is described as "the golden boy of the family; he's sweet, bright and has been indulged since the day he was born. However people shouldn't be fooled by Vinny's innocent exterior, he's no angel and it's safe to say trouble is often close by." Producer Jon Sen said of the family "The Panesar family are set arrive this autumn and will bring their own unique blend of charm and chaos onto the Square. A British Asian family of Punjabi Sikh heritage, Kheerat, Jags and Vinny are three very different brothers who turn up in Walford looking to settle a score – however, fate quickly takes a hand and they find themselves staying for good. We're thrilled to be introducing this vibrant new family to Walford and to be sharing their stories." Of his casting, Jalota said, "It still hasn't sunk in that I'm going to be on EastEnders. As a young boy, I remember being introduced to the Masood family and thinking there are people like me on television. To be part of that next generation of people representing my identity is a blessing. I couldn't be more excited."

Vinny arrives on Albert Square with his brothers in search of their sister Ash Kaur (Gurlaine Kaur Garcha). Vinny eventually tracks her down, and reveals to her that their mother, Suki (Balvinder Sopal), is dying of cancer. Ash refuses to visit because of how she was treated by her and Vinny expresses upset at Ash cutting him out of her life when she left home.

Michaela Turnbull 

Michaela Turnbull, played by Fiona Allen, first appears in episode 6037, originally broadcast on 9 December 2019.

Michaela is the mother of Leo King (Tom Wells), and the ex-wife of Tony King (Chris Coghill). Michaela arrives in Walford after finding out that Leo has been staying there, and when she finds out that he has been in contact with Whitney Dean (Shona McGarty), who her ex-husband groomed, she tries to force him to go home with her. However, Leo slams her to the ground and hits her with his briefcase. After Leo asks Whitney for the truth, he realises that Tony did abuse Whitney. He releases Michaela from the boot of her car and says she was right about Tony and should have believed her, but Michaela calls him "sick" and drives away. When she learns that Leo has died, she takes Whitney hostage. Michaela reveals to her that she knew about Tony grooming her, but did nothing to stop him.

Paul Simper of Radio Times wrote: "The irony is that Michaela should be Whitney's saviour. It's high time she put the sisterhood first and ended both families’ circles of abuse once and for all."

DI Steve Thompson 

Detective Inspector Steve Thompson, played by Philip Wright, first appears in episode 6045, originally broadcast on 23 December 2019. Uncredited during his first appearance, he makes his first credited appearance in episode 6063, originally broadcast on 16 January 2020.

DI Thompson is first seen as a colleague of Jack Branning's (Scott Maslen), when they witness Callum Highway (Tony Clay) attacking Leo King (Tom Wells) and break up the fight. The following month, Thompson questions Karen Taylor (Lorraine Stanley), Phil Mitchell (Steve McFadden) and Ben Mitchell (Max Bowden) about the disappearance of Keanu Taylor (Danny Walters). Karen says she is not worried about her son, while Phil reveals that Keanu had an affair with Phil's wife, Sharon Mitchell (Letitia Dean), and got her pregnant and Ben says they were in the pub when Keanu disappeared. He later arrests Phil and Ben for Keanu's murder and presents Phil with evidence at the police station. DI Thompson later speaks with Sharon about the whereabouts of her son, Dennis Rickman (Bleu Landau), who she believes Phil has taken abroad. Ben tries to speak to Thompson, who rebuffs him and warns him that although they are unaware of Phil's whereabouts, they are watching Ben. When Phil hands himself into the police for the causing a boat crash on the River Thames, DI Thompson questions him about this and his involvement with Keanu. He clashes with Phil's lawyer, Ritchie Scott (Sian Webber), when she pauses the interview. Sharon changes the statement she made about Phil, so to his fury, DI Thompson has to release Phil.

Thompson appears at the scene of Vinny Panesar's (Shiv Jalota) illegal rave with other police officers when a brick is thrown at the window of a police car. He notices Keegan Butcher-Baker (Zack Morris) and Tiffany Butcher-Baker (Maisie Smith) leaving the scene and arrests Keegan for criminal damage and obstruction. He then threatens to arrest Tiffany too. At the station, Jack speaks to him about Keegan's arrest. DI Thompson reads Keegan's previous convictions and explains the situation to Jack, but lies that Keegan threw the brick, insulted him and resisted arrest. Later, Jack speaks to DI Thompson while he is having a cigarette. Jack explains that he viewed the body camera footage from the arrest and is unsure whether Keegan is responsible, which annoys DI Thompson as he sees this as Jack not trusting him. DI Thompson questions Keegan, presenting to him the footage; Keegan threatens to report DI Thompson for the injuries sustained to him during the arrest, but he claims that it is a result of Keegan resisting arrest. Keegan is then released on bail. After footage of the arrest, featuring DI Thompson, is recovered, Jack shows it to Keegan and Tiffany.

At the police station, Thompson warns Callum, now a police constable, about an arrest he made earlier that day; he tells him that the man he arrested has claimed that Callum used excessive force and has gone to A&E to be assessed. He then instructs Callum to search through some CCTV footage of a warehouse as part of his operation to arrest criminal Danny Hardcastle (Paul Usher). Callum spots a blurred image of Ben on the footage which DI Thompson says he will have enhanced and Callum tries to avoid this. Thompson and Jack interview Danny after he is found with a bag of money in his car boot. Danny claims that he has been set up, but refuses to say who did it. Later that day, Thompson arrests Ben on suspicion of armed robbery at the warehouse; Ben refuses to answer his questions. During the arrest, Thompson spots Callum at Ben's house and later, he confronts Callum, quickly realising that he is Ben's partner. Thompson reminds Callum that relationships with convicted criminals should be declared, so blackmails him into helping him to convict Phil in return for his silence and Ben's freedom. Thompson pressures Callum into making a decision. When Callum declines the deal, he warns him that Ben would not do the same for him, so he should reconsider his decision. Ritchie asks for Ben to be released, but Thompson claims that he is giving them an opportunity to prove Ben's innocence, while he awaits Callum's decision. Ben is later released after Callum agrees to Thompson's deal to convict Phil. He later meets with Callum to congratulate him on his decision and convince him that he made the right choice. Thompson and Callum meet again after Phil offers Callum information about his future deals. After Phil asks Callum to perform a police check, Callum informs Thompson, who states that that is not enough evidence to imprison Phil for years. Thompson tells Callum that the team was impressed with how he dealt with a road traffic collision and reminds him that he has opportunity to find evidence on Phil, before asking him to place a recorder in Phil's repair garage, The Arches. Thompson later gives Callum a wire to wear for recording incriminating conversations with Phil. Callum meets him again to withdraw from the operation; Thompson reveals that the operation is not legal, before threatening to expose Callum for assaulting Danny if he reveals the operation. Callum speaks to Thompson about requesting information on Ellie Nixon (Mica Paris); Thompson explains that Ellie used a fake surname and is a known criminal. Callum asks for information on Ellie to give to Phil, claiming that he will help their operation in the long term. Later, DI Thompson meets with Jack, who informs him that Phil kidnapped and attacked him ten months earlier. Jack never reported the crime, so he asks Thompson to claim that he wrote the report, but it went missing. Thompson is hesitant as he is worried about his illegal operation, so Jack decides to do it without his support.

After DI Thompson is caught threatening Callum, he is punched by Stuart Highway (Ricky Champ). Later, Stuart follows Thompson and confronts him. When Thompson taunts Stuart about Callum, he punches him, knocking him out. Believing he has killed Thompson, Stuart moves him to the undertakers and places him in a coffin. After failing to check on him in the days afterwards, Stuart learns that Thompson was seen at a disciplinary hearing and realises he had survived and escaped the coffin. Stuart is later taken in for questioning, with Thompson threatening to charge him for attempted murder unless Callum pushes further in his efforts to take down Phil. A panicked Callum tells Jack about the situation. Jack blackmails Thompson into giving up his pursuit of Phil unless he wants his dodgy dealings revealed. After Thompson hands over all of his evidence, Jack persuades him to retire from the police.

Other characters

References 

2019
EastEnders
EastEnders